Bhagwati Dhar Vajpayee (1924/1925 – 6 May 2021) was an Indian journalist. He was the founder and editor-in-chief of Yuga Dharma, a Hindi daily newspaper. In 2006, he was awarded the Manikchandra Vajpayee National Journalism Award by the Government of Madhya Pradesh. The award was presented by the Public Relations Minister and Chhattisgarh Culture Minister Brijmohan Agrawal.

He started his career in journalism with former Prime Minister Atal Bihari Vajpayee and Pandit Deendayal Upadhyaya in Lucknow in the 1950s. He joined Swadesh in 1952. From 1957 to 1990, he was associated with Yuga Dharma and worked as an editor-in-chief of the news publication. He also served as the president of the District Journalist Association, Jabalpur and Mahakoshal Chamber Of Commerce And Industries.

At the age of 96, he died of a heart attack on May 6, 2021. The Chief Minister Shivraj Singh Chauhan and Director General of Indian Institute of Mass Communication, Sanjay Dwivedi, expressed deep grief on his death.

References 

 

1920s births
Year of birth uncertain
2021 deaths
Indian male journalists
Hindi journalists
Indian editors
20th-century Indian journalists
Journalists from Madhya Pradesh